France carried out a series of 24 nuclear tests from 1971–1974 These tests followed the 1966–1970 French nuclear tests series and preceded the 1975–1978 French nuclear tests.

Notes

References

French nuclear weapons testing
1971 in France
1972 in France
1973 in France
1974 in France
1971 in the French colonial empire
1972 in the French colonial empire
1973 in the French colonial empire
1974 in the French colonial empire